Hoylake and Meols (previously Central-Hoose-Meols-Park, 1973 to 1979, and Hoylake, 1979 to 2004) is a Wirral Metropolitan Borough Council ward in the Wirral West Parliamentary constituency.

Councillors

References

Wards of Merseyside
Politics of the Metropolitan Borough of Wirral
Wards of the Metropolitan Borough of Wirral